Schistura scaturigina is a species of ray-finned fish, a stone loach, in the genus Schistura. It is found in high altitude streams with gravelly bottoms in the upper Ganges basin in Nepal and the Indian states of Bihar, West Bengal, Jharkhand, Sikkim and Uttar Pradesh.

References

S
Fish of Bangladesh
Fish described in 1839